Dmitry Arkhipov (born February 2, 1993) is a Russian professional ice hockey player. He is currently an unrestricted free agent who most recently played with HC Sochi of the Kontinental Hockey League (KHL).

Arkhipov made his Kontinental Hockey League debut playing with Ak Bars Kazan during the 2014–15 KHL season.

Awards and honours

References

External links

1993 births
Living people
Ak Bars Kazan players
Russian ice hockey forwards
HC Sochi players